Dr. Mopuragundu Thippeswamy is an Indian politician from Andhra Pradesh. Presently, he is a member of YSR Congress Party. Previously, he was member of Indian National Congress Party. He was an elected Member of Andhra Pradesh Legislative Assembly from Madakasira and Palamaner Constituencies. He contested the Chittoor Loksabha Constituency during the year 2009 from Indian National Congress Party. Presently, by the new judgement of High court; Dr. M. Thippeswamy can continue as Member of Legislative Assembly for Madakasira as from 2018.

Political career 
He entered politics and contested to be Member of Legislative Assembly during the year 1994 from Palamaner and was elected to Andhra Pradesh State Legislative Assembly during 1999 elections.

References

External links 
 Dr. M. Thippeswamy on Facebook.

Year of birth missing (living people)
Living people
Andhra Pradesh MLAs 2019–2024
YSR Congress Party politicians